Baccharis linearis, the romerillo or Chilean little rosemary, is a common shrub in Central Chile. It is frequently found in old field after agriculture. Cecidia or galls caused by the fruit fly Rachiptera limbata grow as white, spongy and globose tissues on the twigs of the plant.

Description
This densely branched, shrubby species reaches heights of 1-3 m. The branches are erect. Young branches have a green bark, which becomes reddish brown with age. The linear, sessile, rarely dentate leaves are 0-30 mm long and 0-2.5 mm wide. Dentate leaves are observed on young plants, but this characteristic is lost in later ontogenic stages, in which only linear leaves devoid of any dentation are formed. The capitula are formed in groups. In male plants they are 3-4.5 mm wide and in female plants they are 2-3 mm wide. They are attached to the branches by 3-8 mm long peduncles.

Natural hybridisation
This species is part of a homoploid hybrid swarm involving Baccharis macraei. Together both parent species form the natural hybrid Baccharis intermedia.

References

linearis
Plants described in 1798
Flora of Chile
Dioecious plants